Petar Chaulev (1882 – December 23, 1924) was a Bulgarian revolutionary in Ottoman Macedonia. He was a local Bulgarian leader of the Internal Macedonian Revolutionary Organization (IMRO).

Born into an Orthodox Albanian family in Ohrid. His father was a Tosk Albanian fisherman from southern Albania. Chaulev was fluent in Albanian, and spent several years living in Albania where he got the nickname 'Petrush'.
He graduated from the Bulgarian gymnasium in Bitola, moving in revolutionary circles. He participated in the Ilinden-Preobrazhenie Uprising and later became a Bulgarian teacher and secretary within the local revolutionary organization. After the Young Turks Revolution in 1908 he associated with the left wing of IMRO - People's Federative Party (Bulgarian Section). During the Balkan Wars Chaulev supported the Bulgarian Army. After the Second Balkan War he led the Ohrid-Debar Uprising in 1913 against the Serbs. During the First World War he served as a sergeant in the Bulgarian army and later was appointed as governor of Ohrid.

Chaulev was also a writer, publishing the book Skipia (Albania) in 1924 in Istanbul.
After the First World War Chaulev rejoined the IMRO. In 1924 IMRO forged connections with the Comintern. Chaulev later signed the "May Manifesto" in Vienna along with Alexandar Protogerov concerning the formation of a Balkan Communist Federation and cooperation with the Soviet Union. They did this in secrecy despite the position of IMRO leader Todor Alexandrov. Chaulev was assassinated for this action in Milan in December 1924.

References

1882 births
1924 deaths
People from Ohrid
People from Manastir vilayet
Members of the Internal Macedonian Revolutionary Organization
Bulgarian revolutionaries
Bulgarian educators
Bulgarian military personnel of the Balkan Wars
Bulgarian military personnel of World War I
Macedonian Bulgarians
Assassinated Bulgarian people
Bulgarian people murdered abroad
People murdered in Italy
Deaths by firearm in Italy
20th-century Albanian military personnel
Rebels from the Ottoman Empire
Albanians from the Ottoman Empire